Tayyiba Mumtaz Haneef-Park (born March 23, 1979) is a retired American indoor volleyball player. She played at the 2004 Summer Olympics in Athens, Greece, where the team finished in 5th place. Haneef-Park also competed in the 2008 Beijing Olympics, where she won a silver medal with team USA.  After her pregnancy in 2010, she returned to Team USA to repeat their silver medal performance at the 2012 London Olympics.  Both times USA lost to Brazil. She is currently the Director of Basketball Administration for the UC Irvine Women's basketball team.

High school and personal life
Haneef-Park was born in Upland, California, to Mobarik and Patricia Haneef. She grew up in Laguna Hills, California, and attended Laguna Hills High School from 1993–1997 where she led the Hawks to the 1997 DII title and was named the California Athlete of the Year and was the Pacific Coast MVP.  She also participated in track and field, winning the CIF California State Meet in the high jump in 1997.

Her name, Tayyiba, is Arabic. Her father's family is Muslim, but she is not.

Her cousin, Tari Phillips, is a former WNBA player currently playing basketball in Italy.

Haneef-Park, who married U.S. Air Force pilot Anthony Park in May 2007, announced her pregnancy on August 21, 2009, through Facebook. The baby was due in March 2010. She resumed training with the U.S. national team in the summer of 2010.

In 2009, Haneef-Park joined Jennifer Joines Tamas appearing on Dr. Phil discussing their exceptional height.  Haneef-Park is the third tallest Olympic volleyball player, marginally behind two Russian players.

College highlights
At Long Beach State she was named to the American Volleyball Coaches Association (AVCA) All-America first team in 2001 after leading LBSU in kills per game (5.03) as a senior. She guided the 49'ers to a 33–1 record and a runner-up finish at the 2001 NCAA Championships. She was a three-time All-Big West first-team selection. As a senior in 2001, she posted a hitting percentage of 0.406 and also averaged 2.31 digs and 0.73 blocks per game as a senior. She was also a three-time All-American high jumper at LBSU, and she competed at the 2000 U.S. Olympic Track and Field Trials, finishing 10th with a jump of 5–10 ¾.  Haneef-Park was inducted into the 49er Athletic Hall of Fame at Long Beach State on November 19, 2008.

Recent international competition
 2012
 Olympic Games (silver medal)
 2011
 FIVB World Cup (silver medal)
 2008
Olympic Games (silver medal)
FIVB World Grand Prix (fourth place)
2007
Pan American Games (bronze medal)
FIVB World Grand Prix (eighth place)
NORCECA Championship (silver medal)
FIVB World Cup (bronze medal)
2006
Pan American Cup (fourth place)
FIVB World Grand Prix (seventh place)
World Championships (ninth place)

Individual awards
 2007 Pan-American Games "Best Server"
 2005 NORCECA Championship "Best Scorer"

References

External links
 FIVB biography
 
 
 

1979 births
Living people
American women's volleyball players
Eczacıbaşı volleyball players
Long Beach State Beach women's volleyball players
Olympic silver medalists for the United States in volleyball
Volleyball players at the 2004 Summer Olympics
Volleyball players at the 2008 Summer Olympics
Volleyball players at the 2007 Pan American Games
Takefuji Bamboo players
Volleyball players at the 2012 Summer Olympics
Medalists at the 2012 Summer Olympics
Medalists at the 2008 Summer Olympics
Track and field athletes from California
Sportspeople from Orange County, California
People from Laguna Hills, California
Pan American Games bronze medalists for the United States
Pan American Games medalists in volleyball
Opposite hitters
Expatriate volleyball players in Italy
Expatriate volleyball players in Japan
Expatriate volleyball players in Russia
Expatriate volleyball players in Turkey
Expatriate volleyball players in Azerbaijan
American expatriate sportspeople in Italy
American expatriate sportspeople in Japan
American expatriate sportspeople in Russia
American expatriate sportspeople in Azerbaijan
Medalists at the 2007 Pan American Games